This list of people from Caledon includes people born, raised, or residing later in life in Caledon, Ontario, as well as people whose business in the area is of note. The page includes not only residents of the Town of Caledon, established in 1974, but northern Chinguacousy, Albion Township, Caledon Township, the village of Bolton, and the village of Caledon East.

A

 Reema Abdo, Olympic swimmer and police officer
 Josh Alexander (b. 1987, Josh Lemay), professional wrestler
 Wallace Lloyd Algie, Victoria Cross winner, Alton

B
 Harry James Barber, British Columbia MP, Alton
 Chanel Beckenlehner (b. 1988), beauty pageant competitor, Miss Universe Canada 2014
 Tony Bethell (1922-2004), Royal Air Force Flight Lieutenant, prisoner of war involved in "The Great Escape", retired to Caledon
 John Knox Blair, Ontario MP, Caledon
 Megan Bonnell, folk musician

C

 Spence Caldwell, broadcaster, Town of Caledon
 Samuel Calvert, soldier, Alberta MLA, Mayor of Chipman, Alberta
 Yann Candele, Olympic equestrian, lives in Caledon
 John Alexander Catherwood, British Columbia MLA
 Isabel Crawford, a Baptist missionary with the Kiowa people in Oklahoma Territory
 Nick Crawford, hockey player

D
 Alfred Doig, copper and tin smith, merchant, Manitoba MLA
 Lorne Duguid, hockey player, Bolton
 Ernest Duke (1880-1954), MLA for Rocky Mountain, Alberta

E

 James East, Edmonton alderman, Bolton
 Signy Stefansson Eaton (1913-1992), socialite, art collector and philanthropist
 Todd Elik, hockey player, Bolton
 Andrew Evans, pairs figure skater

F

 Ray Fletcher Farquharson, MBE, doctor and medical researcher, Claude
 Allison Flaxey, curling, Caledon East
 Caleb Flaxey, curling, Town of Caledon
 William Kingston Flesher, settler, MP, Bolton

G

 George R. Gardiner OC, businessperson and philanthropist
 Helen Gardiner, philanthropist
 Jordan Gavaris, actor, Orphan Black
 Laurie Graham, downhill skiing, Inglewood
 Aldo Guidolin (1932-2015), hockey player and coach, Forks of the Credit

H

 Steven Halko, hockey player, Bolton
 Mary Riter Hamilton, artist, war artist
 Noel Harding (1945-2016), contemporary artist
 Chris Haughton, archer
 Louis Hodgson (1936-2012), Ontario MPP for Scarborough East (1963-1967), Victoria
 William Hodgson, MPP, Bolton
 Jake Holden, Olympic snowboarder
 Peter Holland, hockey player, Bolton
 John Houston, British Columbia newspaper publisher, Alton
 Duncan Selby Hutcheon, Saskatchewan MLA

I
 Elmer Iseler, OC, OOnt, choir director, Town of Caledon Walk of Fame inductee

J

 Norman Jewison, filmmaker, Town of Caledon Walk of Fame inductee
 F. Ross Johnson OC, businessperson, former CEO of RJR Nabisco
 Robert Johnston (1856-1913), farmer and politician, MP for Cardwell

K
 Robert Kennedy, publisher
 Rosemary Kilbourn, printmaker, Albion Hills

L
 Ashley Lawrence, Olympic soccer, Caledon
 Cameron Lawson (b. 1998), CFL football defensive tackle

M

 Zoe MacKinnon, field hockey, Caledon East
 Malgosia Majewska (b. 1981), model and beauty pageant titleholder who won Miss World Canada 2006
 John Joseph Malone, flying ace, Inglewood
 Andrew Mangiapane (b. 1996), NHL ice hockey player
 Bert McCaffrey, ice hockey, born in the Township of Albion to a father from Caledon East, interred in Caledon East
 Hiram E. McCallum, Mayor of Toronto
 Keith McCreary (1940-2003), NHL hockey player, Regional councillor for Caledon
 Jim McGuigan, writer, Palgrave
 Beverly McKnight, duet synchronized swimmer
 Robert and Signe McMichael, gallery founders, Town of Caledon Walk of Fame inductee
 Jenna McParland (b. 1992), NWHL and IIHF ice hockey forward
 Tom Michalopoulos, entrepreneur, Bolton
 Ramona Milano, actor, Due South
 David Milne, artist, Palgrave
 Adam Mitchell (b. 1944), singer and songwriter, The Paupers, lived in Bolton
 John Wendell Mitchell (1880–1951), fiction author of The Yellow Briar
 Paul Morin (b. 1959), artist and children's book illustrator
 Farley Mowat (1921-2014), writer, Palgrave, Town of Caledon Walk of Fame inductee
 Brett Murray (b. 1998), AHL ice hockey player

O

 Organik, Travis Fleetwood, rap battle league owner, Bolton

P
 Andrew Pattulo, MPP
 Shailyn Pierre-Dixon (b. 2003), actress
 Jane Pitfield, past Toronto city councillor, president of the Caledon Heritage Foundation
 Tyler Pizarro, horse jockey
 Chris Pratt, show jumping rider

Q

 Kyle Quincey, hockey player

R
 Darren Raddysh (b. 1996), AHL ice hockey player
 Taylor Raddysh (b. 1998), AHL ice hockey player
 Allan Read, priest at Mono Mills, later the Anglican Bishop of Ontario
 David Reale, voice actor best known for voicing Kai Hiwatari from the Beyblade anime series and Tsubasa Otori from its spin-off series Beyblade: Metal Fusion
 Charles Robinson, MPP and physician, Claude
 Erin Routliffe (b. 1995), professional tennis player
 Kelly Russell, Olympic rugby union player, Bolton
 Laura Russell, rugby union player, Bolton

S

 Jason Saggo, UFC mixed martial artist
 Dave Seglins, journalist, Town of Caledon
 Conn Smythe, sports businessperson, Town of Caledon Walk of Fame inductee
 Alexey Stakhov, mathematician, inventor, engineer, Bolton
 John Stevens, hockey player and coach, Town of Caledon
 Alfred Stork, British Columbia MP, Bolton
 William Stubbs, veterinarian and MP, Caledon Township
 Skye Sweetnam (b. 1988), singer, Cedar Mills
 Thomas Swinarton (1821-1893), MPP for Cardwell, businessman
 Bill Symons, football player, Caledon farm owner
 Gordon Symons (1921-2012), Lord of Whitehouses, author, poet, painter, and pioneer in the Canadian insurance industry

T
 Cory Trépanier, artist and filmmaker

V

Rebecca Vint, professional hockey player with the Buffalo Beauts (NWHL).

W

 William James Wanless, surgeon and humanitarian, founder of a medical mission in Miraj, India who led it for nearly forty years
 Brittany Webster, cross-country skiing, Caledon
 Michael Wekerle, investor
 Harry Albert Willis, Senator, Belfountain
 Erin Woodley, synchronized swimmer
 Thomas Wylie (1841-1915), MPP for Simcoe West

Y
 Andrew Yorke, Olympic triathlon, Caledon (Caledon East)

See also
List of people from Brampton
List of people from Mississauga

References

Caledon
Caledon